The Payson Utah Temple is a temple of the Church of Jesus Christ of Latter-day Saints in Payson, Utah. The temple is located on the southernmost edge of Utah's Wasatch Front, and is the 15th dedicated temple in the state.

History
The intent to construct the temple was announced on January 25, 2010, by church president Thomas S. Monson. The temple is located near the intersection of 930 West and 1550 South in Payson, on previously undeveloped land. Additional details, such as the temple's planned size, were not available at the time of the announcement.

Dallin H. Oaks presided at the groundbreaking ceremony on October 8, 2011, with William R. Walker conducting and Steven E. Snow, Jay E. Jensen, and Janette Hales Beckham in attendance. Jason Chaffetz (representative for Utah's 3rd congressional district, which includes Payson) participated in the shovel ceremony.

When construction was completed in 2015, the temple became one of the largest built in recent years, at 96,630 square feet on a 15-acre lot. A public open house took place from April 24 through May 23, 2015, excluding Sundays. The temple was dedicated by Henry B. Eyring on June 7, 2015.

In 2020, like all the church's other temples, the Payson Utah Temple was closed in response to the coronavirus pandemic.

See also

 The Church of Jesus Christ of Latter-day Saints in Utah
 Comparison of temples of The Church of Jesus Christ of Latter-day Saints
 List of temples of The Church of Jesus Christ of Latter-day Saints
 List of temples of The Church of Jesus Christ of Latter-day Saints by geographic region
 Temple architecture (Latter-day Saints)

References

External links

Payson Utah Temple Official site
Payson Utah Temple at ChurchofJesusChristTemples.org

21st-century Latter Day Saint temples
Religious buildings and structures in Utah County, Utah
Temples (LDS Church) in Utah
2015 establishments in Utah
Religious buildings and structures completed in 2015
2015 in Christianity
Buildings and structures in Payson, Utah